Ahmad Zaharin Aris FASc is an academician and professor of hydrochemistry. He was appointed as a professor at the age of 33 and as a senior professor at the age of 36. He was the Dean of the Faculty of Environmental Studies, Universiti Putra Malaysia from 2016 until 2020. On 1 March 2020, the faculty merged with the Faculty of Forestry to form Faculty of Forestry and Environment. He is then appointed by UPM as the 3rd director of International Institute of Aquaculture and Aquatic Sciences (I-AQUAS), a research institute that upgraded from the Marine Science Centre on 15 December 2017.

Award
 Malaysia Winner for APEC Science Prize for Innovation, Research, and Education (“ASPIRE”), Asia-Pacific Economic Cooperation, 2022
 World Top 2% Scientists 2022 by Stanford University, 2022
 World Top 2% Scientists 2021 by Stanford University, 2021
 Elected Fellow, Academy of Sciences Malaysia, 2021-lifetime. 
 World Top 2% Scientists 2020 by Stanford University, 2020
 Malaysia Winner for APEC Science Prize for Innovation, Research, and Education (“ASPIRE”), Asia-Pacific Economic Cooperation, 2019. 
 Top Research Scientists Malaysia (TRSM) – Environmental Chemistry and Analysis, Academy of Sciences Malaysia, 2018. 
 Best Professor in Environmental Studies, The Golden Globe Tigers Award 2017, 2017.
 Finalist for Zayed International Prize (Young Scientists Award for Environmental Sustainability)
 First Runner Up, National Young Scientist Award 2016 (Anugerah Saintis Muda Negara 2016), Ministry of Science, Technology and Innovation Malaysia, 2016
 SEARCA Regional Professorial Chair, Southeast Asian Regional Centre for Graduate Study and Research in Agriculture (SEARCA), 2016-2017.
 Young Scientist Award 2013 (Vice Chancellor Fellowship Award), Universiti Putra Malaysia, 2014.

References

1983 births
Living people
Academic staff of the University of Putra Malaysia